Zhang Man (born 20 April 1997) is a Chinese athlete. She competed in the women's 200 metres event at the 2019 World Athletics Championships. She did not advance to compete in the semi-finals.

References

External links

1997 births
Living people
Chinese female sprinters
Place of birth missing (living people)
World Athletics Championships athletes for China
21st-century Chinese women